Petre Becheru (born 16 May 1960) is a retired Romanian weightlifter. He won a gold medal at the 1984 Olympics and placed third at the 1987 European Championships.

References

External links
 
 
 
 

1960 births
Living people
Romanian male weightlifters
Olympic weightlifters of Romania
Olympic gold medalists for Romania
Olympic medalists in weightlifting
Weightlifters at the 1984 Summer Olympics
Medalists at the 1984 Summer Olympics
European Weightlifting Championships medalists
People from Teleorman County
20th-century Romanian people
21st-century Romanian people